The 1993 LPGA Tour was the 44th season since the LPGA Tour officially began in 1950. The season ran from February 5 to November 7. The season consisted of 31 official money events. Brandie Burton won the most tournaments, three. Betsy King led the money list with earnings of $595,992, becoming the first to win over $500,000 in a season.

There were nine first-time winners in 1993: Kristi Albers, Helen Alfredsson, Donna Andrews, Missie Berteotti, Helen Dobson, Trish Johnson, Hiromi Kobayashi, Kelly Robbins, and Cindy Schreyer.

The tournament results and award winners are listed below.

Tournament results
The following table shows all the official money events for the 1993 season. "Date" is the ending date of the tournament. The numbers in parentheses after the winners' names are the number of wins they had on the tour up to and including that event. Majors are shown in bold.

Awards

References

External links
LPGA Tour official site
1993 season coverage at golfobserver.com

LPGA Tour seasons
LPGA Tour